Aino Andreyevna Puronen, also Pouronen (born 20 January 1936) is a former Soviet racing cyclist. She won the silver medal at the 1959 UCI Road World Championships.

References

External links

1936 births
Living people
People from Tosnensky District
Soviet female cyclists